2-Oxoisovalerate dehydrogenase subunit beta, mitochondrial is an enzyme that in humans is encoded by the BCKDHB gene.

Function 

Branched-chain keto acid dehydrogenase is a multienzyme complex associated with the inner membrane of mitochondria, and functions in the catabolism of branched-chain amino acids. The complex consists of multiple copies of 3 components: branched-chain alpha-keto acid decarboxylase (E1), lipoamide acyltransferase (E2), and lipoamide dehydrogenase (E3). This gene encodes the E1 beta subunit, and mutations therein have been associated with maple syrup urine disease (MSUD), type 1B. Alternative splicing at this locus results in transcript variants with different 3' noncoding regions, but encoding the same isoform.

References

External links

Further reading

EC 1.2.4
EC 2.7.11
Mitochondrial proteins